Lydia Contreras  is an associate professor at the University of Texas at Austin. She is an American chemical engineer most notable for her work on biomolecular engineering, genetics, and drug discovery.

Education 
Contreras earned her B.S.E. in Chemical Engineering in 2003 from Princeton University and her Ph.D. in Chemical and Biomolecular Engineering in 2008 from Cornell University.

Academic career 
Contreras is known for her experimental and computational work on understanding molecular features that lead to the interaction of RNAs and proteins. Her work has led to the development of new methods and understanding of, for instance, the capacity of RNA nucleotides to establish intermolecular RNA interactions via high-throughput characterization of RNA interfaces.

Following the completion of her PhD, she served as an NIH Postdoctoral Fellow in the Division of Genetics and Bioinformatics, Wadsworth Center at the New York State Department of Health from 2008 to 2010. She then served as a visiting Postdoctoral Fellow in the Department of Biochemistry at the Max F. Perutz Laboratories in Vienna before she began serving as an assistant professor at the University of Texas at Austin. In 2017, she was promoted to Associate Professor in the department of chemical engineering.

References 

Living people
Cornell University College of Engineering alumni
Princeton University School of Engineering and Applied Science alumni
University of Texas at Austin faculty
Year of birth missing (living people)